A wheat berry, or wheatberry, is a whole wheat kernel, composed of the bran, germ, and endosperm, without the husk. Botanically, it is a type of fruit called a caryopsis. They are often added to salads or baked into bread to add a chewy texture. If wheat berries are milled, whole-wheat flour is produced.

Wheat berries are the primary ingredient in an Eastern European Christmas porridge called kutya.  In France, cooked durum wheat berries are commonly eaten as a side dish instead of rice or corn.  This side dish is often called ebly, from the name of the first brand of prepared wheat berries.

See also

Cuccìa, a Sicilian wheat berry dish
Bulgur, another whole wheat preparation
Frumenty, a dish made with boiled wheat berries
Graham flour
Borș, a fermented drink made from sprouted grain

References

Wheat
Cereals